Lebanon... Imprisoned Splendour; is a documentary film written and produced by Daizy Gedeon, covering Lebanon and its history. In the film, several political figures were interviewed by Gedeon, including Jean Obeid, Samir Geagea, Amine Gemayel and Walid Jumblatt. The film also stars Egyptian-Lebanese actor Omar Sharif.

Lebanon... Imprisoned Splendour won several awards including the 1996 Silver Screen Award at the US International Film & Video Festival and was nominated for the Academy Award for Best Documentary Feature.

Cast
 Daizy Gedeon
 Omar Sharif

Awards

References

External links